Agnidra tigrina is a moth in the family Drepanidae. It was described by Hong-Fu Chu and Lin-Yao Wang in 1988. It is found in Yunnan, China.

The length of the forewings is 17–19 mm. Adults are similar to Agnidra vinacea, but there are three arrow-shaped markings at the apex along both sides of the oblique postmedial line, as well as black lines on an orange ground colour.

References

Moths described in 1988
Drepaninae
Moths of Asia